Teresa Thomas "Terry" Fulmer, (Ph.D., RN, FAAN) is the current President of The John A. Hartford Foundation. Prior positions include distinguished professor and dean of the Bouvé College of Health Sciences at Northeastern University, and Dean of the College of Nursing at New York University. She is known for her extensive research in geriatrics and elder abuse. She has received funding from the National Institute on Aging, the National Institute of Nursing Research, and multiple foundations for her research regarding elder abuse.

Education
Fulmer received her bachelor of science, with a major in nursing, from Skidmore College in 1975. In 1977, she received her master's degree in nursing, graduating magna cum laude from Boston College and in 1983 got her Ph.D. in Higher Education Administration from the same institution, graduating with distinguished honors. In 2001, Fulmer received her Post-Master's Certificate as a geriatric nurse practitioner from New York University. She previously has held certification in gerontological nursing from the American Nurses Credentialing Center (1978–2014) and was a Brookdale National Fellow at Columbia University.

Career
In 1977, Fulmer became an instructor of rehabilitation nursing at Salem State College. Starting in 1980 and continuing through 1987, she filled many roles at Boston College, including Assistant Professor of Nursing. She then continued her academic career with various other positions, from lectureship invitations to faculty appointments. These appointments spanned many prestigious institutions: Harvard University, Case Western Reserve University, Yale University, Columbia University, New York University, University of Pennsylvania, and Northeastern University. Notable positions include serving as the Anna C. Maxwell Chair and Associate Dean for Research of the College of Nursing at Columbia University (1992-1995) and The Erline Perkins McGriff Professor and Dean of the College of Nursing at New York University (2005-2011). From 2011-2014, Fulmer was the dean of the Bouvé College of Health Sciences as well as a professor of nursing and public policy/urban affairs in the College of Social Sciences and Humanities at Northeastern University.

In 2015, Fulmer became the President of The John A. Hartford Foundation (JAHF) in New York City, a foundation focused on improving the care of older adults. In addition to her role as the chief strategist for advancing the foundation's goals, she serves on many committees and boards, with the purpose of reframing the culture of aging and promoting Age-Friendly Health Systems. She is the first nurse to have served on the board of the American Geriatrics Society. She is also the first nurse to have served as President of the Gerontological Society of America, which awarded her the Donald P. Kent Award in 2019 for exemplifying the highest standards for professional leadership in the field of aging. In 2020, she was selected to the independent Coronavirus Commission for Safety and Quality in Nursing Homes established to advise the Centers for Medicare and Medicaid Services on the COVID-19 crisis. She is an elected member of the National Academy of Medicine (NAM), where she also takes part in the Forum on Aging, Disability, and Independence. She is currently a Trustee for the Josiah Macy Jr. Foundation, Springer Publishing Company, the Bassett Healthcare System. She has previously served as the Chair of the National Advisory Committee for the Robert Wood Johnson Foundation Executive Nurse Fellows Program, and held board positions at Skidmore College, the Institute for Healthcare Improvement, the Geriatrics and Gerontology Advisory Committee for the U.S. Department of Veterans Affairs, and the Advisory Board for Hong Kong Polytechnic University School of Nursing.

Awards and recognition
As a leading expert in geriatrics, Dr. Fulmer has been nationally and internationally recognized for her work, especially the development of the NICHE program and Age-Friendly Health System movement. She is the recipient of many prestigious awards. PBS’s Next Avenue selected her as one of their top 50 Influencers in Aging. In 2016, she received the Award for Exceptional Service to The New York Academy of Medicine for her distinguished service on the Academy’s Board of Trustees, including as vice-chair and her engagement in the Academy's policy initiatives. In 2017, the American Society on Aging also awarded her the Rosalie S. Wolf Award for her work on elder abuse. Her research in elder abuse and neglect has been funded by the National Institute on Aging and the National Institute of Nursing Research. She is also recognized as a Distinguished Practitioner of the National Academies of Practice and has authored over 150 peer-reviewed papers and edited over 23 books.

Selected works

Honors
1989 Fellow of American Academy of Nursing
1990 Fellow of The Gerontological Society of America 
1990 Distinguished Practitioner of National Academy of Practice
2004 Dennis W. Jahnigen Memorial Award, American Geriatrics Society 
2010 Nurse Leader in Aging Award, American Academy of Nursing
2010 The Doris Schwartz Gerontological Nursing Research Award, The Gerontological Society of America 
2010 Institute of Medicine - Elected Member
2012 The William C. McInnes Award for Professional Excellence, The Boston College Alumni Association
2014 Lifetime Achievement Award, National Gerontological Nurses Association
2016 Influencer in Aging Award, Next Avenue
2018 Honorary Doctoral Degree in Nursing from the University of South Florida
2019 Donald P. Kent Award
2021 Honorary Doctorate from St. Lawrence University
2021 The Dean Rita P Kelleher Award, Connell School of Nursing, Boston College
2021 Living Legend of the American Academy of Nursing 
2022 Champion for Change Award, The Weinberg Center, Hebrew Home for the Aged in Riverdale

References

Living people
People from Pittsburgh
Northeastern University faculty
Skidmore College alumni
Connell School of Nursing alumni
American gerontologists
Fellows of the American Academy of Nursing
Nursing school deans
Nursing educators
Nursing researchers
Advanced practice registered nurses
New York University faculty
Boston College faculty
Harvard University faculty
Yale University faculty
Columbia University faculty
American academic administrators
Year of birth missing (living people)
Members of the National Academy of Medicine